Robbie Warren Derringer is an American actor.

Early life
Derringer was born and raised in Palo Alto, California. He attended the UCLA School of Theater, Film and Television acting program and earned a Bachelor of Arts Degree. Upon graduation he was invited to join Diavolo Dance Theatre.

Career

Derringer has been acting in television and films since 1996. He has also been a company member at the Pacific Resident Theatre, with leading roles in their productions of The Time of Your Life, Of Mice and Men, and The Blue Dahlia. 

Derringer has appeared in the web series The Lake as Jack Riley, directed by Jason Priestley. He played Kyle Sloane on ABC's General Hospital in November 2014, and reprised the role in September 2015. He has had guest roles in shows such as CSI and NCIS. In 1999 he had a recurring role as Andrew Emery in Beverly Hills 90210.

In 2018 Derringer appeared in five episodes of the Facebook Watch drama Queen America in the recurring role of Robert Crowe, an old boyfriend of the show's main character, Vicki Ellis, played by Catherine Zeta Jones.

In 2022 Derringer appeared in the film  Breaking (film)  premiered at the 2022 Sundance Film Festival  on January 21, 2022, where the cast won the Special Jury Award for Ensemble Cast in the U.S. Dramatic Competition.[10] On February 1, 2022, Bleecker Street acquired the film's US distribution rights.[11][12] The film's title was later changed from 892 to Breaking, and it was set to be released on August 26, 2022.[13]

Filmography

Film

Television

References

External links

1967 births
General Hospital
American male television actors
Living people
Male actors from Palo Alto, California
American male film actors
UCLA Film School alumni
20th-century American male actors
21st-century American male actors